Violet Blanche Webb (later Simpson, 3 February 1915 – 27 May 1999) was an English track and field athlete who competed for Great Britain in the 1932 Summer Olympics and in the 1936 Summer Olympics.

She was born in Willesden and died in Northwood, London. She was the mother of Janet Simpson.

In 1932, she travelled to Los Angeles as one of five women entered by the Women's Amateur Athletic Association at the 1932 Los Angeles Summer Olympics as Britain's first female Olympians in athletics events. She finished fifth in the 80 metre hurdles event.  She also featured in the 4x100 metre relay, where she replaced the injured Ethel Johnson, and won the bronze medal with her teammates, Eileen Hiscock, Gwendoline Porter and Nellie Halstead.

Four years later at the Berlin Olympics, she was eliminated in the semi-finals of the 80 metre hurdles competition. Her daughter, Janet Simpson, won the same medal in the same event at the 1964 Summer Olympics in Tokyo.

Webb competed in the 1934 Empire Games, held in London, England, winning the bronze medal in the long jump. In the 80 metre hurdles, she was eliminated in the heats. She also competed at the Women's World Games of 1934, winning a bronze medal at 80 metre hurdles.

She married Charles H. Simpson in 1937.

References

 sports-reference.com
 
 

1915 births
1999 deaths
People from Willesden
British female sprinters
English female sprinters
British female long jumpers
English female long jumpers
British female hurdlers
English female hurdlers
Olympic athletes of Great Britain
Olympic bronze medallists for Great Britain
Athletes (track and field) at the 1932 Summer Olympics
Athletes (track and field) at the 1936 Summer Olympics
English Olympic medallists
Commonwealth Games bronze medallists for England
Commonwealth Games medallists in athletics
Athletes (track and field) at the 1934 British Empire Games
Medalists at the 1932 Summer Olympics
Olympic bronze medalists in athletics (track and field)
Women's World Games medalists
Medallists at the 1934 British Empire Games